HITEC University is a private university located in Taxila Cantonment, Punjab, Pakistan.

Taxila, a historic seat of learning and an important archaeological site, is about 30 km north-west of Islamabad and Rawalpindi.

HITEC University commenced classes in November 2007 with an intake of 250 students, in affiliation with the University of Engineering and Technology, Taxila. The university was granted its own charter in November 2009 by the government of Punjab. The university is sponsored by the Heavy Industries Taxila Education Welfare Trust.

History
HITEC University was conceived as a part of Heavy Industries Taxila Education City (HITEC). The premises were already hosting educational institutes of nursery, school, and college level. In 2007, in affiliation with UET Taxila, BS in Mechanical and Electrical Engineering, BBA and BS Islamic Studies were launched. HITEC university was granted its own Charter by the Government of the Punjab on 17 November 2009 and all students were transferred to HITEC University. HITEC University offers undergraduate, postgraduate and doctorate programs in engineering, Computer Science , Software Engineering , Computer Engineering , Civil Engineering Mathematics , Islamic Studies, and Business Administration. The inauguration was presided by then president General Pervez Musharraf. Five years later, the university opened a new department for Computer Science and in 2019 it launched the Department of Civil Engineering.

Location
Taxila is an ancient city, about 30 km west of the Islamabad Capital Territory and Rawalpindi. It is a tehsil of District Rawalpindi. It is on the border of the Punjab and Khyber Pakhtunkhwa, just off the Grand Trunk Road.
Spread over an area of more than 20 acres, the campus is located at the foot of Margella Hills only 2 km from Taxila City.
Apart from Taxila Museum, a number of important industries including Heavy Industries Taxila (HIT), Heavy Mechanical Complex (HMC), Pakistan Ordnance Factories (POFs), Pakistan Aeronautical Complex (PAC), Telephone Industry Pakistan (TIP), and FECTO Cement  are near the university.

Admissions
The admissions are strictly based on merit. The university is open to all persons without prejudice to gender, religion, race, creed, color, or domicile.

Admission is granted on the basis of eligibility criteria. Applicants, who have appeared in a prerequisite examination prescribed for admission in a program and are awaiting results, will be provisionally admitted against an undertaking that they will pass their examination as per admission criteria.
Students awaiting results are required to submit attested copies of their certificates/degrees within two weeks after the declaration of results, failing which the university will cancel their admissions. Only those students will be registered who would complete all admission formalities including the deposit of their fees and other dues on the prescribed date.

Every undergraduate student shall be expected to take the full load of the courses prescribed for the semester. A master level student, however, will have the option to enroll for fewer courses. Students applying for graduate programs are required to be qualified as per criteria laid down by HEC.

Degree programs
The disciplines and the degree programs offered by HITEC have been tabulated below. The minimum duration of BS and MS / M Phil degree programs is 4 and 1.5 years, respectively.

HITEC Result 2023
HITEC University Entry Test Result
HITEC یونیورسٹی 18 مارچ 2023 کو یونیورسٹی میں داخلے کے لیے انٹری ٹیسٹ لینے جا رہی ہے اور سرکاری اعلان کے مطابق توقع ہے کہ مین یونیورسٹی میں منعقد ہونے والے انٹری ٹیسٹ میں ہزاروں طلباء شرکت کریں گے اور پھر کامیابی حاصل کریں گے۔ HITEC یونیورسٹی ٹیکسلا انٹری ٹیسٹ کا نتیجہ 2023 اس صفحہ سے۔ انٹری ٹیسٹ کی تمام تیاریاں یونیورسٹی حکام نے کر لی ہیں۔

Student societies
Engineering and non-technical societies in the university campus include:
  Adventure and Social Welfare Society.            (Headed By Mr Waqar Ismail, Computer Science Dept)
  Literary and Debating Society.                   (Headed By Engr. Sajid Raza Zaidi, Mechanical Engineering Dept)
  Science Society.                                 (Headed By  Engr. Ehtesham Abid, Electrical Engineering Dept) 
  Creative Arts Society.                           (Headed By Ms. Erum Mushtaq, Electrical Engineering Dept)
  Sports Society.                                  (Headed By Engr. Ayaz Mahmood Khan, Mechanical Engineering Dept)
  Character Building Society.                      (Headed By Dr. Rabnawaz, Islamic Studies Dept)
  Girls Society.                                   (Headed By Engr. Attiya Sadiq, Mechanical Engineering Dept)
  HITEC Robotic Society.                           (Headed By Engr. Shahbaz Khan)

The university has the following co-curricular societies:
 ASME Student Chapter HITEC University.
 ASHRAE Student Chapter HITEC University.
 IEEE Student Chapter HITEC University.
The students are popularly referred to as Hitonians

Press Clubs

 HITEC University Media Club (HMC)
 HITEC University Press Club (HPC)

MOU with foreign universities
HITEC University has a memorandum of understanding with some universities and institutions worldwide. The list is as follows:
  University of Strathclyde.
  İstanbul Technical University.
Universiti Teknologi Malaysia.

Transport
A transport facility of buses is provided to students from Rawalpindi and Islamabad.

Hostel
The university administration took a step to meet the needs of students by building a new hostel (Jinnah Hostel) with all facilities which has become a success. Now, the university has two internal hostel buildings for boys.

Masjid and Religious Education Complex
There is a masjid in HITEC University premises where students can offer prayers. It has a capacity of 700 worshipers. It is a beautiful masjid, where students of the HITEC complex can come and perform their salats, and communicate with their god.

There is one Religious Education Complex under the Masjid where Hifz and Nazira Quran classes are conducted.

Library

General collection
The general collection is organized according to Dewey Decimal Classification and shelved subject-wise according to call numbers (100-999) pasted on the spine of each item.

Reference collection
A significant number of current reference sources are available on reference shelves. Electronic databases including, dictionaries, encyclopedias, handbooks, directories, yearbooks, atlases, and bibliographies are distinct features of this collection. The reference books can only be consulted within the library.

Journals and magazines
The library has a good collection of periodicals and all leading newspapers: seven daily national newspapers (three Urdu and four English) including Dawn Business Recorder, etc. The library has national magazines of computers, general and current affairs.

Digital Library
To meet the information requirements of students and researchers with the provision of quality scholarly materials, there is an information-based electronic Digital Library. Access to all these resources is free from within the HITEC University Digital Library.

Islamic Library
Adjacent to the university masjid, a separate library for Islamic and religious books is situated.

Online Readiness

HITEC University was assessed 100% ready for online preparedness by Higher Education Commission of Pakistan to conduct classes during the lock down period. Assessment was carried out by a third party engaged by the Higher Education Commission of Pakistan.

References

External links
 

Pakistan Army universities and colleges
Universities and colleges in Rawalpindi District
Taxila Tehsil